Sindal Municipality was a municipality in Denmark. It was located on the island of Vendsyssel-Thy at the top of the Jutland peninsula in northern Denmark and belonged to North Jutland County. It was abolished effective 1 January 2007. The municipal seat was located in the town of Sindal.

Geography 
The former Sindal municipality covered an area of 242 km², and had a total population of 9,425 (2005).

Merger 
On January 1, 2007 Sindal municipality ceased to exist due to Kommunalreformen ("The Municipality Reform" of 2007). It was merged with existing Hirtshals, Hjørring, and Løkken-Vrå municipalities to form an expanded Hjørring Municipality. This created a municipality with an area of 929,58 km² and a total population of ca. 67,816.

External links 
 The new Hjørring municipality's official website

Former municipalities of Denmark